Cristalândia do Piauí is the southernmost city of the Brazilian state of Piauí.

References 

Populated places established in 1962
Municipalities in Piauí